Magnum Berhad is a company in Malaysia known principally for commercial gambling.

Formerly known as Magnum Corporation and Magnum Corporation Berhad, the company was incorporated in December 1968 and was the first private company to be granted a license to promote, operate and manage 4-digit numbers forecast betting in Malaysia. Magnum was converted to a public company in 1970 and was subsequently listed on the Kuala Lumpur Stock Exchange ("KLSE") in the same year. However, it was de-listed on 2 July 2008 following the completion of a privatisation exercise. Magnum then reverted to be a private limited company and changed its name to the current one. Magnum was 51% owned by Multi-Purpose Holdings Berhad through Magnum Holdings Sendirian Berhad and the remaining 49% is held by CVC Asia Pacific Limited. In June 2013, following a demerger exercise, Multi-Purpose Holdings Berhad sold off its non-gaming business to MPHB Capital Berhad and renamed Multi-Purpose Holdings Berhad to Magnum Berhad.

Today Magnum is principally engaged in the gaming business in the Malaysian authorised gaming industry.

In September 2009, Magnum launched an extension of the successful 4Digit Classic game, which introduced a pari-mutuel element into the game. This game was copyrighted by Magnum in 2013.

References

External links
Official Website

1975 establishments in Malaysia
Companies listed on Bursa Malaysia
Gambling companies of Malaysia